Ann Ireland (1953–2018) was a Canadian fiction author who published five novels between 1985 and 2018.  Her first novel, A Certain Mr. Takahashi (1985), was the winner of the Seal $50,000 1st Novel Award. She also wrote 1996's The Instructor, which was shortlisted for the Trillium Book Award, and 2002's Exile, which was shortlisted for the 2002 Governor General's Awards and the Rogers Writers' Trust fiction prize.

Life
Ireland was born in Toronto, Ontario. She studied at the University of British Columbia, from which she earned a BFA in creative writing in 1976. She is a past president of PEN Canada and for many years, up until the time of her death, was a writing instructor and the coordinator of the Writing Workshops Department at the Chang School of Continuing Education at Ryerson University in Toronto.  Her 1985 novel, A Certain Mr. Takahashi, was the basis for the 1991 feature film The Pianist.

Her final novel, 2018's Where's Bob?, was published in May 2018, shortly before her death of carcinoid syndrome at the age of 65.

Bibliography

References

1953 births
2018 deaths
20th-century Canadian novelists
21st-century Canadian novelists
Writers from Toronto
University of British Columbia alumni
Canadian women novelists
20th-century Canadian women writers
21st-century Canadian women writers